Amto–Musan is a language family of two closely related but mutually unintelligible Papuan languages, Amto and Siawi, spoken along the Samaia River of Sandaun Province of Papua New Guinea.

Languages
Foley (2018) and Usher (2020) agree that the family consists of two languages.

Amto–Musan / Samaia River family
Amto (Ki)
Musan (Musian, Siawi)

External relationships
Amto–Musan was left unclassified by Ross (2005) (see Papuan languages#Ross (2005)) due to lack of data; Wurm (1975) had posited it as an independent family. The family has typological similarities with the Busa language isolate, but these do not appear to demonstrate a genetic relationship.

Timothy Usher links the Amto–Musan languages to their neighbors, the Arai languages and the Pyu language in as Arai–Samaia stock.

Foley (2018) classifies them separately as an independent language family. Foley also notes that due to heavy contact and trade with Left May languages, Amto–Musan languages have borrowed much cultural vocabulary from Left May.

Cognates
Amto-Musan family cognates listed by Foley (2018):

{| 
|+ Amto-Musan family cognates
! gloss !! Amto !! Musan
|-
| ‘bad’ || supuware || pioware
|-
| ‘bird’ || ai || ʔai
|-
| ‘black’ || towan || tewane
|-
| ‘breast’ || ne || ne
|-
| ‘ear’ || ye || ʔe
|-
| ‘eye’ || mo || mene
|-
| ‘fire’ || mari || mari
|-
| ‘leaf’ || he || sɛʔ
|-
| ‘liver’ || tei || teʔ
|-
| ‘louse’ || nanu || nanu
|-
| ‘man’ || kyu || yɛnokono
|-
| ‘mother’ || ena || inaʔ
|-
| ‘nape’ || tipiyari || tibiare
|-
| ‘older brother’ || apɔ || aboʔ
|-
| ‘road’ || mo || mono
|-
| ‘sago’ || tɔ || tawe
|-
| ‘tongue’ || həne || hanɛ
|-
| ‘tooth’ || i || ʔi
|-
| ‘tree’ || ami || ameʔ
|-
| ‘water’ || wi || wi
|}

Possible cognates between the Amto-Musan and Left May families:

{| 
|+ Possible Amto-Musan family and Left May family cognates
! gloss !! Amto !! Musan !! Ama !! Nimo !! Owiniga
|-
| ‘breast’ || ne || ne || nano || nɔ || nano
|-
| ‘arm’ ||  || næ || naino || ina
|-
| ‘louse’ || nani || nanu || ani ||  || eni
|-
| ‘tooth’ || i || ʔi || i || i
|-
| ‘water’ || wi || wi || iwa || wi || bi
|}

Possible loanwords reflecting the close trade relationship between Amto-Musan and Left May speakers:
‘arrow’  Amto lamu, Musan namu, Ama lamu
‘stone’:  Amto tabeki, Musan tipeki, Bo təpəki, Ama tomoki

Vocabulary comparison
The following basic vocabulary words are from Conrad & Dye (1975), as cited in the Trans-New Guinea database:

{| class="wikitable sortable"
! gloss !! Amto !! Siawi
|-
! head
| twæ || nani
|-
! hair
| (twæ) iwɔ || nanigi
|-
! ear
| ye || eʔ
|-
! eye
| mo || mene
|-
! nose
| ni || Ǐimʌ
|-
! tooth
| i || ʔi
|-
! tongue
| hæne; hʌne || hanɛ
|-
! louse
| nanu || nani
|-
! dog
| hɔ || soː
|-
! pig
| ma || kinʌdiʔ
|-
! bird
| ai || ʔai
|-
! egg
| aiː || iǏɔ
|-
! blood
| nʌkei || hařʔ
|-
! bone
| hae || hařʔ
|-
! skin
| ka || ʔaoko
|-
! breast
| ne || ne
|-
! tree
| amɩ || ameʔ
|-
! man
| kyu || yɛnokono
|-
! woman
| hama || ʔeǏo
|-
! water
| wiː || wi
|-
! fire
| maři || maǏi
|-
! stone
| tipeki || tʌbɛki
|-
! road, path
| mo || mono
|-
! eat
| meːne || pe
|-
! one
| ohu || sʌmo
|-
! two
| kiyaA || himolo
|}

References

External links
Amto-Musan languages database at TransNewGuinea.org

 
Arai–Samaia languages
Languages of Sandaun Province